Julien Brun (born 1 April 1992) is a French professional golfer. He has won three times on the Challenge Tour, firstly in 2012 as an amateur, before winning again at the Open de Bretagne and the Empordà Challenge in 2021.

Amateur career
Brun played college golf at Texas Christian University. In his freshman year (2011–12), he won three events. He also won the opening tournament of the 2012–13 season.

In September 2012, Brun won the Allianz Golf Open Toulouse Metropole on the Challenge Tour. He was the sixth amateur to win in Challenge Tour history.

In 2015, Brun medaled at one of the qualifying school events for the PGA Tour Canada.

Professional career
Brun turned professional in mid-2015 after graduating from university. He played on the Canadian tour for two season, 2015 and 2016 but had little success. He played a number of events on the 2017 Alps Tour, winning the Ein Bay Open in Egypt, the opening event of the season. Brun played primarily on the Challenge Tour in 2017, 2018 and 2019.

In 2020 Brun played on the Pro Golf Tour, winning twice, at the Open Casa Green Golf in February and the Gradi Polish Open in July. He was also twice runner-up during the season and finished second in the Order of Merit to gain a place on the Challenge Tour for 2021. In June 2021, Brun lost a playoff for the D+D Real Czech Challenge. Tied with Kristian Krogh Johannessen and Santiago Tarrío after 72 holes, the playoff went to the fourth extra hole before Tarrio won with a birdie 3. Three weeks later he won the Open de Bretagne, his first on the Challenge Tour as a professional, two ahead of Chase Hanna and Jérôme Lando-Casanova.

Professional wins (7)

Challenge Tour wins (3)

Challenge Tour playoff record (0–1)

Alps Tour wins (1)

Pro Golf Tour wins (2)

Czech PGA Tour wins (1)

Team appearances
Amateur
European Boys' Team Championship (representing France): 2008, 2009, 2010
Junior Ryder Cup (representing Europe): 2008
Eisenhower Trophy (representing France): 2012
Palmer Cup (representing Europe): 2012 (winners), 2013
European Amateur Team Championship (representing France): 2011, 2013, 2014

See also
2021 Challenge Tour graduates

References

External links

French male golfers
European Tour golfers
TCU Horned Frogs men's golfers
Sportspeople from Alpes-Maritimes
People from Antibes
1992 births
Living people
21st-century French people